The Purushottam Karandak, is an annual inter-collegiate Marathi one -act play competition where students from across Maharashtra representing their respective college participate. The inter-collegiate one-act play competition is known for giving a platform to amateur actors, some of whom have become professional actors, directors and playwrights.

History
The founding members of Maharashtriya Kalopasak, were Purushottam Ramchandra Vaze, Bhagwanrao Pandit, Prabhudas Bhupatkar, Keshavrao Date and Mahamopadhyay Datto Vaman Potdar  In 1962 the death of the founding member Purushottam Ramchandra Vaze aka Appasaheb was a big loss for the theatre fraternity and dedicated to his memory Rajabhau Natu, a stalwart in experimental theatre suggested of organizing an inter-collegiate inter-collegiate one-act play competition and thus in 1963, Purushottam Karandak was started.

In the years 2022 First time in the history of Purshottam Karandak it happened that awards were cancelled was  due to lack of merit.

Venues
Purushottam Karandak takes place at Bharat Natya Mandir every year.

Famous Purushottam Participants
Some of the actors and  directors who were the participants of Purushottam Karandak are 

 Pravin Tarde
 Rohini Hattangadi 
 Jabbar Patel
 Satish Alekar
 Mohan Agashe
 Mohan Gokhale
 Mohan Joshi
 Sonali Kulkarni
 Mrinal Kulkarni
 Subodh Bhave
 Shivraj Waichal
 Amey Wagh
 Abhay Mahajan
 Siddharth Menon
 Nipun Dharmadhikari
  Dipali A
 Alok Rajwade 
 Aaroh Welankar
 Suvrat Joshi
 Vaibhav Tatwawadi

References

Competitions in India
Theatre in India
Marathi theatre
1963 establishments in India
Culture of Pune